Cluster Springs is an unincorporated community and census-designated place (CDP) in Halifax County, Virginia, United States. The population as of the 2010 census was 811.

Geography
The community is in southern Halifax County, along U.S. Route 501, which leads north  to South Boston and south  to Roxboro, North Carolina.

It is drained by tributaries of the Dan River and is part of the Roanoke River watershed.

References

Census-designated places in Halifax County, Virginia
Unincorporated communities in Virginia
Census-designated places in Virginia